Mahesh Kumar Malani is a Pakistani politician who has been a member of the National Assembly of Pakistan since August 2018. He is the first non-Muslim to win a general seat (non reserved seat) in the National Assembly of Pakistan.

Political career
He belongs to a political Family of Tharparkar he started his political career in 1996-97 and remained President PPP District Tharparkar and president minority wing PPP Province Sindh. He contested election against Shaukat Aziz in 2004 on NA-229 Tharparkar and then he again contested general election on NA-229 Tharparkar in 2008 and elected as MNA from PPP 	Reserved seat for minorities from 2008-3013 and he also remained Chairman standing committee of NA on Minorities affairs. He contested election on PS-61 Tharparkar in 2013 secured 42,137 votes by defeating Arbab Naimatullah of Arbab Group (29,346) votes and Rana Hameersingh of PML-F (11,348) votes. He served as chairman on standing committee PAS ON food. In 2018 Dr. Mahesh Malani secured 109,056 votes and defeated Arbab Zakaullah of GDA (89,290) votes. And became first non-Muslim elected as MNA on General seats after LFO 2001-02. Apart from this NA-222 has cast highest voter turnout in 2018 that is 70.91%. Recently he has been appointed as Special Assistant to the Prime minister with the Portfolio of National Health Services, Regulations & Coordination.

See also
Pushpa Kumari Kohli
Veeru Kohli
 List of members of the 15th National Assembly of Pakistan
 List of Pakistan Tehreek-e-Insaf elected members (2013–2018)
 No-confidence motion against Imran Khan

External links

References

Living people
Pakistani MNAs 2018–2023
Pakistani Hindus
Pakistan People's Party MNAs
Thari people
Tharparkar District
1962 births